Paul Andréota (11 December 1917 – 14 November 2007) was a French novelist and screenwriter.  He was also known under the pen name Paul Vance.

Biography 
Paul Andréota was born in La Rochelle in the Charente-Maritime department (when the department was then known as Charente-Inférieure).  When he was 12 years old, his father died, and he and his family moved to Paris.  After earning a Bachelor of Arts degree and entering the École Normale Supérieure, he started studying music, particularly piano and composition, at the conservatory; he was a big fan of jazz.

The onset of World War II changed Andréota's life dramatically.  He spent part of the period of the German occupation of France in Marseille, which became the setting for his first novel after the war, Hors Jeu (lit. "Offside"), published by Grasset in 1947.  He then wrote and published Evangeline (1948), which he dedicated to his friend, writer Michel Perrin, and Attentat à la pudeur (lit. "Indecent Assault") in 1949.  These two autobiographical novels inspired him to move in another direction.

He then became a screenwriter, doing adaptations and dialogues. He wrote approximately 40 films, collaborating with famous directors. In 1968, while continuing to write for the stage, he returned to literature. Meanwhile, he also wrote screenplays and dialogues for the TV series Commissaire Moulin and Marie Pervenche. "The Mask").

Works

Novels as Paul Andréota 
 Hors Jeu, Grasset, 1947
 Evangéline, Fasquelle, 1948
 Attentat à la pudeur, Denoël, 1949

Mystery novels as Paul Andréota 
 Ni tout à fait le même (lit. "Not Quite the Same"), Denoël, 1968
 Zigzags, PJ/Julliard, 1969 - Grand Prix de Littérature Policière (1970); reissued by Le Livre de Poche (1977)
 La Pieuvre (lit. "The Octopus"), PJ/Julliard, 1970 - adapted for film as Les Suspects (lit. "The Suspects"); reissued by Club des Masques (1981)
 Le Piège (lit. "Trap"), Stock, 1972 - Best Screenplay, published in the United States as The Sweet Taste of Burning
 Les Lames (lit. "Blades"), Stock, 1973
 Le Scénario (lit. "Scenario"), Stock, 1974
 La Maison des oiseaux (lit. "The House of Birds"), 1975; reissued by Le Masque (1981)
 Schizo, 1977

Mystery novels as Paul Vance 
 Le Puits, la corde et le seau (lit. "The Well, The Rope, and The Bucket") (1977)
 Échec à l'innocence (lit. "Failure to Innocence") (1977)

Filmography

Writer (Adaptations and dialogue) 
 1954 - La Rage au corps (US title:  Tempest in the Flesh) - directed by Ralph Habib
 1954 - Secrets d'alcôve (lit. "Alcove Secrets") - the "Riviera-Express" segment, realized by Ralph Habib
 1954 - Orient Express - directed by Carlo Ludovico Bragaglia
 1955 - Escale à Orly (lit. "Stopover at Orly") - directed by Jean Dréville
 1955 -  - directed by Guy Lefranc
 1956 - La Sorcière (lit. "The Witch") - directed by André Michel
 1956 - Women's Club - directed by Ralph Habib
 1957 -  (lit. "The Skin of the Bear") - directed by Claude Boissol
 1958 -  (lit. "Raids on the Town") - directed by Pierre Chenal
 1959 - Le Passager clandestin (English:  "The Stowaway") - directed by Ralph Habib and Lee Robinson
 1961 - Napoleon II, the Eagle - directed by Claude Boissol
 1963 - Les Bonnes Causes (lit. "The Good Causes") - directed by Christian-Jaque
 1964 - La Tulipe noire (lit. "The Black Tulip") - directed by Christian-Jaque
 1965 - Me and the Forty Year Old Man - directed by Jack Pinoteau
 1966 -  - directed by Christian-Jaque
 1966 - La Nuit des adieux (lit. "The Night of Farewells") - directed by Jean Dréville and Isaak Menaker
 1968 - Love in the Night  - directed by Marcel Camus
 1971 - Franz - directed by Jacques Brel
 1972 -  (No encontré rosas para mi madre) (lit. "Red Roses and Green Peppers (No Roses Found for My Mother)") - directed by Francisco Rovira Beleta
 1974 - Verdict - directed by André Cayatte
 1974 -  - directed by

References

External links 
 

1917 births
2007 deaths
People from La Rochelle
French crime fiction writers
French male screenwriters
20th-century French screenwriters
Writers from Nouvelle-Aquitaine
20th-century French male writers
French male novelists
20th-century French novelists